Chicago Fire FC II is an American professional soccer team that is located in Bridgeview, Illinois. It is the reserve team of Chicago Fire FC and participates in MLS Next Pro.

History 
On December 6, 2021, the Chicago Fire FC were named as one of 21 clubs that would field a team in the new MLS Next Pro league beginning in the 2022 season.

Players and staff

Roster

Staff 
 Alex Boler – General Manager
 Ludovic Taillandier – Head Coach
 Patrick Nyarko – Assistant Coach

Team Records

Year-by-year

Head coaches record

See also 
 Chicago Fire U-23
 MLS Next Pro

References

External links 
 

Association football clubs established in 2021
2021 establishments in Illinois
Chicago Fire FC
Soccer clubs in Illinois
Reserve soccer teams in the United States
MLS Next Pro teams